was the son of the reputed leader Suzuki Sadayu and final leading head of the Saika Ikki during the latter years of the Sengoku period of feudal Japan. He was also nicknamed as Saika Magoichi. He also was a friend of Ankokuji Ekei.

He is said to be Sadayu's second eldest son, but the truth behind the matter remains unknown. This is mainly because his name is not listed in historical records available to the public, making the authenticity of the "Shigehide" name even more dubious. Though said to be a warrior of distinguished prowess, details regarding his services remain scant. Aside from his distinct hatred for Nobunaga, the rest of his history is filled with half-truths, rumors, or theories. According to the Sengoku Engi, he was said to have been a great warrior.

It is said that he participated in the Hongan-ji riots as well and led 3,000 gunmen into battle. He is accredited for causing Harada Naomasa's death on the field. Despite being allied with the Miyoshi clan, legends state that Shigehide sympathized with the Honganji rebels and was only loyal to them. When the Saika group surrendered to Hideyoshi years later, Shigehide was said to have tried to save his family from destruction. However, he could not convince Hideyoshi to spare them and his family's property fell into ruin.

From there, the tales surrounding his fate differ from one another. One story says that he served Hideyoshi briefly before he also decided to commit suicide. Another states that he faithfully continued to serve the Toyotomi family until Sekigahara and joined the Eastern army. There, he was employed by Date Masamune to be his secondary arquebus troop. A few tales said that he became a wanderer and died as a hermit late in his life. After Torii Mototada's downfall during the battle of Sekigahara, he is said to have lived the rest of his days as a rōnin in Mito Domain.

In woodblock prints of the Edo period which showed him, his name was often given as "Suzuchi Hida-no-kami Shigeyuki", due to the strict censorship of the period, which forbade illustration of recent historical events.

External links

Shigehide at SamuraiWiki

Samurai
1546 births
1586 deaths